The 1966 Liège–Bastogne–Liège was the 52nd edition of the Liège–Bastogne–Liège cycle race and was held on 2 May 1966. The race started and finished in Liège. The race was won by Jacques Anquetil of the Ford France team.

General classification

References

1966
1966 in Belgian sport
1966 Super Prestige Pernod